Betsy Joslyn (born April 19, 1954 in Staten Island, New York) is a Broadway musical and dramatic actress and soprano. Joslyn is best known for her Broadway work, including the original 1979 production of Sweeney Todd. She appeared in the ensemble of the original Broadway production and eventually took over the ingenue role of Johanna after Sarah Rice. She is married to conductor Mark Mitchell.

Broadway credits
 1979–82: Sweeney Todd – Ensemble/Johanna (1979, Broadway); Johanna (1980–81, National Tour; September 12, 1982, television production)
 1982: A Doll's Life – Nora
 1985: Sunday in the Park with George – Dot/Marie
 1988: Into the Woods – The Witch (from July 5 to December)
 1989: A Few Good Men – Lt. Cmdr. Joanne Galloway 
 1993: The Goodbye Girl – Paula
 1998: High Society – Patsy
 2000: Les Misérables – Madame Thénardier (starting July 24)

Off Broadway credits
 1975: The Fantasticks – Luisa
 1990: Light Up the Sky – Frances Black (Roundabout Theatre)
 1991: Colette Collage – Colette
 1991: Cabaret Verboten – Revue (CSC Repertory Theatre)<ref>Simon, John. [https://books.google.com/books?id=eukCAAAAMBAJ&dq=%22Betsy+Joslyn%22&pg=RA1-PA120 Review:'Cabaret Verboten' "] New York Magazine, November 11, 1991, p. 120</ref>

Major touring credits
 1980–81: Sweeney Todd – Johanna (National Tour)
 1984: Camelot – Guenevere
 1989: Into the Woods – Witch (May, National Tour)
 1992: City of Angels – Oolie/Donna
 1996–97: Beauty and the Beast'' – Mrs. Potts

References

External links

Biography and career at filmreference

1954 births
Living people
American musical theatre actresses
American sopranos
American stage actresses
American film actresses
American television actresses
21st-century American women